Alfred Hamilton Williams (born November 6, 1968) is a former American football player. He was a linebacker and defensive end in the National Football League (NFL) for the Cincinnati Bengals, San Francisco 49ers and Denver Broncos.  His nicknames include "Big Al", "Hot Plate", and "the Condor".

College career
Williams played linebacker at the University of Colorado at Boulder. He was a unanimous All-American pick in 1990, a consensus All-American in 1989 and the 1990 Butkus Award winner. Williams was also the Captain of the 1990 Colorado National Championship Team. He ended his career with the Colorado Buffaloes with 263 tackles and 35 sacks. In 2008, he was included on the College Football Hall of Fame ballot.
Then in 2010, he was elected to the College Football Hall of Fame.

Professional career
Williams was selected by the Bengals in the first round (18th pick overall) of the 1991 NFL Draft. He was a part of the Super Bowl champion Denver Broncos in 1997 and 1998. He was selected as an All-Pro defensive end in 1996. He retired from the game after the 1999 season.

In media 
From 2006 to 2019, Williams served as an on-air personality for Denver sports radio station KKFN. In February 2019, Williams left the station and signed with iHeartMedia, where he began hosting KOA's new afternoon drive show Big Al & JoJo beginning September 3, 2019.

References

1968 births
Living people
All-American college football players
American Conference Pro Bowl players
American football defensive ends
American football linebackers
Cincinnati Bengals players
College Football Hall of Fame inductees
Colorado Buffaloes football players
Denver Broncos players
People from Houston
San Francisco 49ers players